The 15th Racquetball World Championships were held in Seoul (South Korea) from August 13 to 21, 2010, with 16 men's national teams and 11 women's national teams; and several players in the Singles and Doubles competition.

The incumbent champions in men's and women's singles were Americans Rocky Carson and Rhonda Rajsich, respectively, and they successfully defended their titles in Seoul.

In doubles, the Americans successfully defended the men's doubles title, and Mitch Williams was part of the winning team again, although in 2010 he won with Ben Croft while in 2008 Jason Thoerner was his partner.

In women's doubles, Paola Longoria and Samantha Salas broke a 22-year streak of American victories by defeating the defending champions Jackie Paraiso and Aimee Ruiz and claiming the first women's doubles title for Mexico.



Men's singles competition

Women's singles competition

Men's doubles competition

Women's doubles competition

Men's team competition

Women's team competition

See also
Racquetball World Championships

References

External links
 Official Website
IRF website

Racquetball World Championships
Racquetball World Championships
Racquetball World Championships
Sport in Seoul
International sports competitions hosted by South Korea
Racquetball in South Korea